Julio César Villalba Gaona (born 17 September 1998) is a Paraguayan professional footballer who plays as a forward for Ecuadorian club Guayaquil City.

Club career
Villalba signed with Borussia Mönchengladbach in January 2017.

Upon returning to Paraguay, he featured for Cerro Porteño U20 in the 2016 U-20 Copa Libertadores.

He made his first-team debuts for Cerro Porteño during 2016 and the club will enjoy little of him before the player departs permanently to the Bundesliga.

On 8 January 2020, Villalba was sent on loan to SC Rheindorf Altach of the Austrian Bundesliga for the remainder of the season.

International career
Villalba featured in Cerro Porteno's youth academy and Paraguay U17 alongside Sergio Díaz.

Villalba played at the 2015 South American Under-17 Football Championship, making 8 appearances.

He then featured at the 2015 FIFA U-17 World Cup making three appearances and scoring two goals against Syria U17 and France U17.

References

External links
 
 
 

1998 births
Living people
Sportspeople from Ciudad del Este
Paraguayan footballers
Paraguayan expatriate footballers
Paraguay under-20 international footballers
Association football forwards
Cerro Porteño players
Borussia Mönchengladbach players
SC Rheindorf Altach players
Guayaquil City F.C. footballers
Paraguayan Primera División players
Bundesliga players
Austrian Football Bundesliga players
Paraguayan expatriate sportspeople in Germany
Expatriate footballers in Germany
Expatriate footballers in Austria